Sir Walter Thorburn (1842–1908) was a Scottish industrialist and Liberal Unionist Party politician who served as Member of Parliament for Peebles and Selkirk in the House of Commons of the United Kingdom from 1886 to 1906.

Life
He was the third son of Walter Thorburn, a banker of Springwood, Peebles, and his wife Jane Grieve, born 22 November 1842. He became a director of Walter Thorburn Bros, Ltd., manufacturers of woollens, and a landowner. He was knighted in the 1900 New Years Honours List and awarded the insignia of a Knight Bachelor at an Investiture on 9 February 1900 at Osborne House by Queen Victoria.

Thorburn died on 10 November 1908.

Family
Thorburn married in 1871 Elizabeth Jackson Scott, daughter of David Scott of Meadowfield, Duddingston. They had a family of four sons and six daughters.

References 

1842 births
1908 deaths
Scottish Liberal Party MPs
People from Peebles
UK MPs 1886–1892
UK MPs 1892–1895
UK MPs 1895–1900
UK MPs 1900–1906
19th-century Scottish politicians
20th-century Scottish politicians
Knights Bachelor
19th-century Scottish businesspeople